La Jolla Shores, with its northern part Scripps Beach, is a beach and vacation/residential community of the same name in La Jolla, San Diego, California. The La Jolla Shores business district is a mixed-use village encircling Laureate Park on Avenida de la Playa in the village of La Jolla Shores.

Shores meets the Scripps Institution of Oceanography campus and Kellogg Park, encompasses the Scripps Pier and borders the San Diego-La Jolla Underwater Park Ecological Reserve to the south. The beach is a popular launch point for kayakers as it is the only beach boat launch in the San Diego city limits. The beach is also popular among stand up paddlers, swimmers and snorkelers. The southern end of the beach is especially rich with wildlife. During certain times of year, leopard sharks, diamond stingrays, round stingrays, and species of guitarfish are common. Green sea turtles and broadnose sevengill sharks are elusive but can be found farther offshore.

Described by the Orange County Register as "the best beach in the area", La Jolla Shores regularly features in the TruTV show, Beach Patrol: San Diego and Lifeguard on The Weather Channel.

Gallery

See also

 List of beaches in San Diego County
 List of California state parks

References

External links
La Jolla Shores.
Scripps Institution of Oceanography

La Jolla, San Diego
Beaches of Southern California
Parks in San Diego
Beaches of San Diego County, California

Scripps Pier, La Jolla